ISIS, short for Intel System Implementation Supervisor, is an operating system for early Intel microprocessors like the 8080. It was originally developed by Ken Burgett and Jim Stein under the management of Steve Hanna and Terry Opdendyk for the Intel Microprocessor Development System with two 8" floppy drives, starting in 1975, and later adopted as ISIS-II as the operating system for the PL/M compiler, assembler, link editor, and In-Circuit Emulator (developed by Steve Morse). The ISIS operating system was developed on an early prototype of the MDS 800 computer, the same type of hardware that Gary Kildall used to develop CP/M.

Overview

Communication with the user is terminal-like. Its user interface is somewhat CP/M-like, even from the program interface point of view. For file opening, the program sends the name of file and gets back a handle. Each device has a name, which is entered between a pair of colons (:F0: and :F1: are floppies, :LP: is printer, etc.). Each diskette has one directory and no subdirectories. ISIS-II has been distributed as part of the Intel Microprocessor Development System and includes standard operating system commands (COPY, DELETE, DIR, RENAME, FORMAT) and debugging software (assembler, linker and debugger for external debugging in the developed device). There are two editors, one of which, AEDIT, contains editing macros support. File editing is provided directly on diskette (a .BAK file is always created). The other editor is CREDIT.

ISIS-II needed at least 32 kilobytes of RAM, the 8080/8085 CPU maximum address space was 64 kilobytes. In the MDS-800 and Series-II, the Monitor occupied F800h to FFFFh. Floppy disk format was 8-inch single-sided, 250 KB single-sided, single-density FM, or 500 KB single-sided, double-density MMFM. ISIS-PDS was also software and media incompatible and unique, it came on 720 KB DSDD 5¼-inch floppies with the Intel personal development system (iPDS-100).

The ISIS-IV operating system was another incompatible (even with other Intel development systems) that ran on the iMDX-430 Series-IV Network Development System-II.

Intel ASM80, PLM-80, BASIC-80, COBOL-80, FORTRAN-80 were all available for ISIS-II.
ASM86, ASM48, ASM51 were available as well.

Commands
The following list of commands are supported by the ISIS-II console.

 IDISK
 FORMAT
 FIXMAP
 DEBUG
 SUBMIT
 DIR
 COPY
 HDCOPY
 DELETE
 RENAME
 ATTRIB
 BINOBJ
 HEXOBJ
 OBJHEX
 EDIT
 LIB
 LINK
 LOCATE

See also
 CONV86
 CP/M
 RMX (operating system) or iRMX

References

External links
 ISIS-MDS Obsolete ISIS SW, MDS HW Retrieved 2016-11-24
 Intel MDS 80 - Microcomputer Development System
 Joe's Intel MDS web page
 ISIS II Users Guide
 Intel ISIS Command-Video
 Reverse engineered source
 Additional reverse engineered source
 ISX - An ISIS-II emulator

Intel software
Microcomputer software
Disk operating systems
Floppy disk-based operating systems